Leslie Eugene Norman (born February 25, 1969) is a former Major League Baseball outfielder who played for two seasons. He played in 24 games for the Kansas City Royals during the 1995 Kansas City Royals season and 54 games during the 1996 Kansas City Royals season.  

Norman appeared as a contestant on Wheel of Fortune on January 5, 2018.

References

External links

1969 births
Living people
Major League Baseball outfielders
Baseball players from Michigan
Kansas City Royals players
St. Francis Fighting Saints baseball players
Kansas City T-Bones players
Joliet JackHammers players
Sioux Falls Canaries players
Contestants on American game shows
Appleton Foxes players
Buffalo Bisons (minor league) players
Eugene Emeralds players
Memphis Chicks players
Oklahoma RedHawks players
Omaha Golden Spikes players
Omaha Royals players